Candidula unifasciata is a species of air-breathing land snail, a terrestrial pulmonate gastropod mollusk in the family Geomitridae. 

Subspecies
 Candidula unifasciata acosmia (Bourguignat, 1882)
 Candidula unifasciata soosiana (H. Wagner, 1933)
 Candidula unifasciata unifasciata (Poiret, 1801)
 Candidula unifasciata vincae (De Stefani, 1883)

Distribution

This species occurs in European countries and islands including:
 Great Britain
 Netherlands
 France
 Switzerland
 Austria
 Germany
 Poland
 Czech Republic
 Slovakia - in Slovakia it was recognized under the name Candidula soosiana

References

 Studer, S. (1820). Kurzes Verzeichnis der bis jetzt in unserm Vaterlande entdeckten Conchylien. Naturwissenschaftlicher Anzeiger der Allgemeinen Schweizerischen Gesellschaft für die Gesammten Naturwissenschaften, 3 (11): 83-90; (12): 91-94. Bern
 Alten, J. W. von. (1812). Systematische Abhandlung über die Erd- und Flußconchylien welche um Augsburg und der umliegenden Gegend gefunden werden. I-XVI, 1-120, Tab. I-XIV.
 Provoost, S.; Bonte, D. (Ed.) (2004). Animated dunes: a view of biodiversity at the Flemish coast [Levende duinen: een overzicht van de biodiversiteit aan de Vlaamse kust]. Mededelingen van het Instituut voor Natuurbehoud, 22. Instituut voor Natuurbehoud: Brussel, Belgium. ISBN 90-403-0205-7. 416, ill., appendices pp. 
 Kerney, M.P., Cameron, R.A.D. & Jungbluth, J-H. (1983). Die Landschnecken Nord- und Mitteleuropas. Ein Bestimmungsbuch für Biologen und Naturfreunde, 384 pp., 24 plates

External links
 http://www.animalbase.uni-goettingen.de/zooweb/servlet/AnimalBase/home/species?id=1305
 Poiret, J. L. M. (1801). Coquilles fluviatiles et terrestres observées dans le Département de l'Aisne et aux environs de Paris : prodrome. xi + 119 pp
 Chueca, L. J., Schell, T. & Pfenninger, M. (2021). Whole-genome re-sequencing data to infer historical demography and speciation processes in land snails: the study of two Candidula sister species. Philosophical Transactions of the Royal Society B. 376: 20200156

 
 
unifasciata
Gastropods described in 1801